Josef Hamouz (born 8 April 1980) is a Czech professional football player. He plays as a defender.

Career
After several seasons playing professional football in his homeland, Hamouz signed a two-year contract with Austrian Football Bundesliga side SV Mattersburg in June 2009.

References

External links
 

1980 births
Living people
People from Ostrov (Karlovy Vary District)
Czech footballers
Association football defenders
FK Baník Most players
FC Slovan Liberec players
SK Kladno players
FK Jablonec players
SV Mattersburg players
FC Zbrojovka Brno players
Egri FC players
Czech First League players
Austrian Football Bundesliga players
Czech expatriate footballers
Expatriate footballers in Austria
Expatriate footballers in Hungary
Czech expatriate sportspeople in Austria
Czech expatriate sportspeople in Hungary
SK Sparta Krč players
Sportspeople from the Karlovy Vary Region